Kim Gook-hee is a South Korean actress and model. She is best known for her roles in dramas such as Hospital Playlist and she is also known for her roles in movies such as Microhabitat, Kim Ji-young: Born 1982 and 1987: When the Day Comes. She is best known for her role as Eun-ja in movie, Tune in for Love.

Personal life
Kim Gook-hee is married to Ryu Kyung-hwan.

Filmography

Film

Television series

Web series

Awards and nominations

References

External links 
 
 
 

1985 births
Living people
People from Daejeon
21st-century South Korean actresses
South Korean female models
South Korean television actresses
South Korean film actresses